Empress Dowager Xiaohe (孝和皇太后; 1582  – 1619), of the Wang clan, was a Ming dynasty consort of the Taichang Emperor and the biological mother of Tianqi Emperor.

Biography 
Lady Wang became a concubine of Taichang Emperor when he was the crown prince.She was chosen to be a concubine of Taichang Emperor with the rank of Lady of Selected Service (Chinese: 選侍; Pinyin: xuǎn shì), a third rank Consort of the Crown Prince.

In December 1605, Lady Wang gave birth to Zhu Chanluo's first son who would become the  Tianqi Emperor. Lady Wang was promoted to the rank of Talented Lady. In 1607, she gave birth to another son who lived only until 1610.

When Zhu Youjian became emperor, he posthumously awarded his mother with title of Empress Dowager  Xiaohe Gongxian Wenmu Huici Xietian Sheng and moved her tomb to Qingling to be buried alongside her husband.

Titles 
 During the reign of the Wanli Emperor (r. 1572–1620):
 Lady Wang (王氏; from 1582)
 Lady of Selected Service (選侍)
 Talented Lady (才人; from 1604)
 During the reign of the Tianqi Emperor (r.1620–1627):
 Empress Dowager Xiaohe Gongxian Wenmu Huici Xietian Jusheng' (孝和恭獻溫穆徽慈諧天鞠聖皇太后; from 1621)

Issue 

 As Lady of Selected Service: 
 Zhu Youjiao, the Tianqi Emperor (熹宗 朱由校; 23 December 1605 – 30 September 1627), the Taichang Emperor's first son
 As Talented Lady:
 Zhu Youxue, Prince Jianhuai (簡懷王 朱由㰒; 1607–1610), the Taichang Emperor's second son

References 

 

1582 births
1618 deaths
Ming dynasty imperial consorts
16th-century Chinese women
16th-century Chinese people
17th-century Chinese women
17th-century Chinese people
People from Beijing